Jesus People USA (JPUSA) pronounced: ǰ-pu-sa is a Christian intentional community  in Uptown, on the North Side of Chicago, Illinois. 

JPUSA emerged from Jesus People Milwaukee in 1972, and maintains one of the largest continuing communities (100-450 members) produced by the Jesus movement. In 1989, JPUSA joined the Evangelical Covenant Church as a member congregation, and currently has eight pastors credentialed with the ECC. The community organized the annual Cornerstone Festival from 1984 until 2012.

Background 

Today Jesus People USA is "one of the largest single-site communes in the United States" and is certainly one of the few communes with such an eclectic cultural mix of hippies, punks, "crusties" and other members from various subcultures.

Cornerstone magazine and the Christian rock band the Resurrection Band are part of the JPUSA community. In recent years, Resurrection Band disbanded, but Glenn Kaiser continues touring and playing, both solo and with the blues-based GKB (Glenn Kaiser Band). JPUSA also has its own recording company, Grrr Records. JPUSA was once the home of film producer/art promoter Anthony Cox (who was formerly the husband of Yoko Ono) and their daughter Kyoko, singer/songwriter Daniel Smith as well as bass player/vocalist Christian Wargo.

Legacy and continued presence in Chicago 

JPUSA's social significance stems more from the group's continued presence in Chicago and its historic roots in the 1960s, according to sociologist Shawn Young. It is one of the most contemporary significant groups from the Jesus movement era:

Founded in 1972, this community is one of the most significant surviving expressions of the original Jesus Movement of the sixties and seventies and represents a radical expression of contemporary countercultural evangelicalism.  JPUSA's blend of Christian Socialism, theological orthodoxy, postmodern theory and ethos of edgy artistic expression (as demonstrated at their annual music festival) prove what some scholars have longed suspected: evangelicalism is a diverse, complex movement, which simply does not yield to any attempt at categorization.

Controversy

Enroth controversy 

In 1993 JPUSA elders learned that Dr. Ronald Enroth was researching a sequel to his book Churches That Abuse, which was said to mention issues of abuse within JPUSA. Despite efforts of elders to convince Enroth to edit JPUSA out of the book, it was published in 1994 and included a full chapter of accounts of alleged abuse within the group. The release of the book set off a "firestorm of debate among religious scholars." JPUSA elders referred to the book as "poison in the well." Ruth Tucker, a professor at Trinity Evangelical Divinity School, defended the movement, saying Enroth was "sadly misdirected and his research methods seriously flawed." Paul R. Martin, the director of Wellspring Retreat and Resource Center, one of the few residential treatment centers in the world for former members of "abusive groups," supported Enroth's findings, saying that his facility had seen a flood of requests for help from former members and that JPUSA "displays virtually every sign that I watch for in overly authoritarian and totalistic groups." Ronald Enroth himself responded to JPUSA in the book, in part, with:

There has been much correspondence between leaders of the Covenant Church and JPUSA and me since I began to do the research for this book. They have questioned the integrity of my reports, the reliability of my respondents, and my sociological methodology, but I have conducted more than seventy hours of in-depth interviews and telephone conversations with more than forty former members of JPUSA. They have also largely discounted the reports of abusive conditions past and present in the JPUSA community. ... Unwilling to admit serious deficiencies and insensitivity in their pastoral style, the leaders of JPUSA have instead sought to discredit the former members who have cooperated with my research efforts.

According to a later newspaper article, as a result of the book's mention of JPUSA, "scores" of members decided to leave the group.

Chicago Tribune criticism 

In 2001, the Chicago Tribune published a two-part article primarily critical of the movement, with quotes from several ex-members accusing the group of authoritarian practices. One of the JPUSA activities criticized in the article includes "adult spankings," employed after charismatic leader Jack Winters introduced it as a means to heal the "inner child." The practice, which lasted approximately four years in the mid-1970s, was abandoned by the group, with leaders citing it as reflective of how "spiritually immature" the group was at the time.

JPUSA issued a response to the two-part article, found on their website, which accuses the article of "anti-religious bias and cultural intolerance."

Accusations of sexual abuse 

A lawsuit was filed in January 2014 against JPUSA and its parent denomination, the Evangelical Covenant Church claiming that children were sexually abused by members of JPUSA and its leadership covered it up for years. No Place to Call Home is a documentary that shares the stories of former children of JPUSA members who allegedly were sexually abused. As of March 3, 2015, the case was dismissed for want of prosecution.

References

External links 

 Jesus People USA
 Religious Movements profile of JPUSA (hosted by the University of Virginia)
 Christianity Today's coverage of JPUSA and controversies
 The Apologetics Index's profile of JPUSA (critical, links to many Enroth saga documents)
 A journalist living at JPUSA discusses the Enroth saga
 My Year At JPUSA (An anthropology student's report)
 Christian Radicalism in Chicago’s Inner-City (Academic article on JPUSA)
 MA Thesis from 1990 on JPUSA

1972 establishments in Illinois
Christian communities
Christian denominations established in the 20th century
Christian rock
Christianity in Chicago
Intentional communities in the United States
Jesus movement
Religious organizations based in Chicago
Christian organizations established in 1972